Sargon is a genus of true weevils in the family of beetles known as Curculionidae. There are at least two described species in Sargon.

Species
These two species belong to the genus Sargon:
 Sargon carinatus Broun, 1903 c g
 Sargon hudsoni Broun, 1909 c g
Data sources: i = ITIS, c = Catalogue of Life, g = GBIF, b = Bugguide.net

References

Further reading

 
 
 
 
 

Curculionidae